Carmen "Nick" Barone (June 12, 1926 – March 12, 2006) was an American boxer, a ranked contender in the light heavyweight division and heavyweight divisions during the late 1940s and 1950s. He was known as the "Fighting Marine."  He is best known for his December 1950 title fight against the world heavyweight champion Ezzard Charles in the Cincinnati Gardens. His record was 44 wins (21 ko's), 12 losses, 1 tie for a  total of 57 bouts.

During World War II, at the age of 16, Barone joined the United States Marine Corps using his brother's name.  He fought in the Battle of Iwo Jima.

Notes

References

External links

 America Loses One of  Greatest Fighters by Troy Ondrizek May 2006 East Side Boxing

1926 births
2006 deaths
Boxers from New York (state)
Heavyweight boxers
Light-heavyweight boxers
United States Marine Corps personnel of World War II
United States Marines
Battle of Iwo Jima
American male boxers
Child soldiers in World War II